Anthozela is a genus of moths belonging to the subfamily Olethreutinae of the family Tortricidae.

Species
Anthozela anambrae (Razowski & Wojtusiak, 2012)
Anthozela anonidii (Ghesquire, 1940)
Anthozela bathysema (Diakonoff, 1984)
Anthozela chrysoxantha Meyrick, 1913
Anthozela cypriflammella (Heppner & Bae, 2018)
Anthozela daressalami Razowski, 2013
Anthozela hemidoxa (Meyrick, 1907)
Anthozela hilaris (Turner, 1916)
Anthozela macambrarae (Razowski & Wojtusiak, 2014)
Anthozela postuma (Razowski & Wojtusiak, 2012)
Anthozela prodiga (Razowski & Wojtusiak, 2012)
Anthozela psychotriae (Razowski & J.W. Brown, 2012)
Anthozela usambarae (Razowski & Wojtusiak, 2014)

See also
List of Tortricidae genera

References

External links
tortricidae.com

Enarmoniini
Tortricidae genera
Taxa named by Edward Meyrick